The paroophoron (of Johnson) consists of a few scattered rudimentary tubules, best seen in a child, situated in the broad ligament between the epoöphoron and the uterus. Named for the Welsh anatomist David Johnson who originally described the structure at the University of Wales, Aberystwyth.

It is a remnant of the mesonephric tubules.

See also
 Epoophoron

References

External links
 
 

Mammal female reproductive system